Mothers against decapentaplegic homolog 1 also known as SMAD family member 1 or SMAD1 is a protein that in humans is encoded by the SMAD1 gene.

Nomenclature
SMAD1 belongs to the SMAD, a family of proteins similar to the gene products of the Drosophila gene 'mothers against decapentaplegic' (Mad) and the C. elegans gene Sma. The name is a combination of the two; and based on a tradition of such unusual naming within the gene research community.

It was found that a mutation in the 'Drosophila' gene, MAD, in the mother, repressed the gene, decapentaplegic, in the embryo. Mad mutations can be placed in an allelic series based on the relative severity of the maternal effect enhancement of weak dpp alleles, thus explaining the name Mothers against dpp.

Function 
SMAD proteins are signal transducers and transcriptional modulators that mediate multiple signaling pathways. This protein mediates the signals of the bone morphogenetic proteins (BMPs), which are involved in a range of biological activities including cell growth, apoptosis, morphogenesis, development and immune responses. In response to BMP ligands, this protein can be phosphorylated and activated by the BMP receptor kinase. The phosphorylated form of this protein forms a complex with SMAD4, which is important for its function in the transcription regulation. This protein is a target for SMAD-specific E3 ubiquitin ligases, such as SMURF1 and SMURF2, and undergoes ubiquitination and proteasome-mediated degradation. Alternatively spliced transcript variants encoding the same protein have been observed.

SMAD1 is a receptor regulated SMAD (R-SMAD) and is activated by bone morphogenetic protein type 1 receptor kinase.

References

External links 
 Drosophila Mothers against dpp - The Interactive Fly
 
 

Transcription factors
Developmental genes and proteins
MH1 domain
MH2 domain
R-SMAD
Human proteins